The 40th Manitoba Legislature was created following a general election in 2011.

The New Democratic Party (NDP) led by Greg Selinger formed a majority government.

Following the election, Hugh McFadyen of the Progressive Conservative Party stepped down as Leader of the Opposition. Brian Pallister became Progressive Conservative party leader and Leader of the Opposition in September 2012.

The Lieutenant Governor was Philip S. Lee until 2015, then Janice Filmon.

Members of the 40th Legislative Assembly

Members in bold are in the Cabinet of Manitoba
† Speaker of the Assembly

Source:

Standings changes in the 40th Assembly

Source:

See also
2007 Manitoba general election
Legislative Assembly of Manitoba

References

Terms of the Manitoba Legislature
2011 establishments in Manitoba